Euphoria, originally released as simply The EP is a 1996 EP by Vinnie Vincent, self released on Vincent's own Metaluna label. The purpose was to preview material for an album called Guitarmageddon which has yet to materialize. In 2021, Vincent said that Guitarmageddon will come out in the next "12 to 18 months."
 
It was recorded in the early 1990s with Vincent on guitar and bass guitar, former Vinnie Vincent Invasion vocalist Robert Fleischman, and drummer Andre LaBelle. These sessions were paid for by Enigma Records who were to release the full record, Vincent ended up dissatisfied with the recordings. For reasons unknown, Vinnie Vincent overdubbed LaBelle's drums with a drum machine before releasing it in 1996.

Track listing

Personnel
Robert Fleischman - Vocals
V. Meister - Drums (credit only)
Vinnie Vincent - Guitars, bass, backing vocals

Uncredited musicians

 Andre LaBelle - Drums

Production 

 Phil Kenzie - Co-producer, engineer
 Vinnie Vincent - Producer, engineer

References 

1996 EPs
Vinnie Vincent albums